General Locke may refer to:

Matthew Locke (U.S. Congress) (1730–1801) North Carolina Militia general in the American Revolutionary War
William Locke (general) (1894–1962), Australian Army major general

See also
Robert Lock (British Army officer) (1879–1957), British Army major general
General Loch (disambiguation)